Waitangi may refer to:

 Waitangi, Northland, New Zealand, where the Treaty of Waitangi was signed
 Waitangi, Chatham Islands, New Zealand

See also
 Treaty of Waitangi, a New Zealand constitutional document
 Waitangi Day, a New Zealand public holiday
 Waitangi Day Acts, two acts passed by the New Zealand Parliament in 1960 and 1976
 Waitangi Park, recreation space in Wellington, New Zealand
 Waitangi Treaty Monument, Paihia, New Zealand
 Waitangi Tribunal, a New Zealand permanent commission of inquiry
 Waitangi River (disambiguation)